This was the front bench of Gerry Adams, who led Sinn Féin's parliamentary delegation to Dáil Éireann from 2011 until 2018, upon the election of Mary Lou McDonald as leader.

Initial front bench
Adams's first front bench was announced on Tuesday 22 March 2011.

 Gerry Adams - Leader
 Mary Lou McDonald - Deputy Leader and Public Expenditure and Reform
 Pearse Doherty - Finance
 Aengus Ó Snodaigh - Social Protection and Party Whip
 Caoimghín Ó Caoláin - Health and Children
 Peadar Tóibín - Enterprise, Jobs and Innovation and An Gaeltacht
 Jonathan O'Brien - Justice, Equality and Defence
 Pádraig MacLochlainn - Foreign Affairs and Trade
 Martin Ferris - Communications, Energy and Natural Resources 
 Seán Crowe - Education and Skills 
 Brian Stanley - Environment, Community and Local Government 
 Michael Colreavy - Agriculture, Food and Marine 
 Dessie Ellis - Transport and Housing 
 Sandra McLellan - Arts, Heritage, Tourism and Sport

2012 reshuffle
Adams announced a reshuffle on 13 September 2012.

 Gerry Adams - Leader
 Mary Lou McDonald - Deputy Leader and Public Expenditure and Reform
 Pearse Doherty - Finance
 Aengus Ó Snodaigh - Social Protection and Party Whip
 Caoimghín Ó Caoláin - Health and Children
 Peadar Tóibín - Enterprise, Jobs and Innovation and An Gaeltacht
 Pádraig MacLochlainn - Justice, Equality and Defence
 Seán Crowe - Foreign Affairs, Trade and Diaspora
 Martin Ferris - Communications, Energy and Natural Resources 
 Jonathan O'Brien - Education and Skills
 Brian Stanley - Environment, Community and Local Government 
 Michael Colreavy - Agriculture, Food and Marine 
 Dessie Ellis - Transport and Housing 
 Sandra McLellan - Arts, Heritage, Tourism and Sport

2016 reshuffle
Following the 2016 general election and government formation, Adams announced these spokespeople on 11 May.

Dáil
 Gerry Adams - Leader
 Mary Lou McDonald - Deputy Leader and all-Ireland Spokesperson on Mental Health & Suicide Prevention
 Aengus Ó Snodaigh - Chief Whip and Defence              
 Pearse Doherty - Finance
 Louise O'Reilly - Health
 Carol Nolan - Education & Skills
 Eoin Ó Broin - Housing, Planning & Local Government
 David Cullinane - Public Expenditure & Reform and all-Ireland Spokesperson on Workers' Rights
 Martin Kenny - Agriculture, Food & the Marine
 Peadar Tóibín - Regional Development, Rural Affairs, Arts & the Gaeltacht
 Jonathan O’Brien - Justice & Equality and Drug & Alcohol Abuse
 Donnchadh Ó Laoghaire - Children & Youth Affairs
 Seán Crowe - Foreign Affairs & Trade, the EU and the Diaspora
 John Brady - Social Protection
 Brian Stanley - Communications, Climate Change & Natural Resources
 Maurice Quinlivan - Jobs, Enterprise & Innovation
 Imelda Munster - Transport, Tourism & Sport and Urban Renewal
 Caoimhghín Ó Caoláin - Disability Rights & Older People
 Denise Mitchell - Deputy Whip and Junior Spokesperson on Social Protection
 Dessie Ellis - Junior Spokesperson on Housing, Planning & Local Government
 Kathleen Funchion - Junior Spokesperson on Children & Youth Affairs (with special responsibility for Childcare)
 Martin Ferris - Junior Spokesperson on Agriculture, Food & the Marine (with special responsibility for Fisheries & the Marine)
 Pat Buckley - Junior Spokesperson on Mental Health & Suicide Prevention

Seanad
 Rose Conway-Walsh - Seanad Group Leader and Rural Ireland
 Paul Gavan - Seanad Whip and Workers' Rights & Collective Bargaining
 Pádraig Mac Lochlainn - Jobs & the Economy
 Fintan Warfield - Youth, Arts & LGBT Rights
 Máire Devine - Health & Wellbeing
 Niall Ó Donnghaile - North/South Integration
 Trevor Ó Clochartaigh - An Gaeilge and the Diaspora and Housing, Regional Development, Rural Affairs, Arts & the Gaeltacht

References

2011 establishments in Ireland
2011 in Irish politics
Adams
Sinn Féin